Anna Fischer-Dückelmann (1856–1917). She was one of the first women to receive a medical degree in the German-speaking countries, received from the University of Zurich. In 1896 she earned a degree at the University and at this time women were still not allowed to be enrolled in German universities or medical schools. She has since been known as a naturopath and physician for women in Germany. She has published many books and they have been converted into many different languages.

Life 
Anna Dückelmann was the daughter of the Austro-Hungarian military doctor and landowner Friedrich Dückelmann. She spent her youth in Vienna and Tragwein. Because of her early interest in medicine, she was allowed to accompany her father on visits to garrison hospitals. In her memoirs she wrote: "I was already enthusiastic about hydrotherapy at the age of fifteen, I also curated pets, and when I was sixteen years old I published my first hygiene article against the corset. During this time, the thought of studying medicine clearly entered my mind for the first time." 

In 1880, against her parents' wishes, she married the philosopher Arnold Fischer in Graz and moved with him to Frankfurt. She decided to keep her maiden name, which was not common in the 1800s. Arnold Fischer worked for the Frankfurter Tagblatt, and the couple founded the weekly newspaper Volkswohl together, in which Fischer-Dückelmann wrote about medical topics and also criticized the lack of female doctors: "It remains embarrassing for many women that they should let men teach them about the most delicate things. How immature our sex is until it is able to protect itself from such male interventions in its innermost affairs by female physicians." In Frankfurt she met the first gynaecologist in Germany, Hope Bridges Adams Lehmann.

As a mother of three children, she moved to Zürich with her family at the age of 34. She studied medicine there from 1890 to 1896, and received her doctorate with her dissertation The cases of postpartum infections observed from April 1888 to January 1895 in the Zurich women's clinic. She was one of the first women to study medicine, which was not without controversy and led to discussions in the specialist press. Early on, Fischer-Dückelmann criticized the use of untested methods in gynecology, which caused many women to die of bleeding. She called for a better distinction between new and actually useful methods and began to deal with naturopathy. 

In the Bilz sanatorium in Oberloessnitz (today Radebeul) she acquired the practice as an assistant doctor to practice the medical profession.

From 1897 to 1914, she ran a medical practice for gynaecology and paediatrics in the Villa Artushof in Oberloschwitz near Dresden and was the first, and for a long time the only, doctor who dealt with naturopathy.

When the World War I broke out, she moved to Monte Verità near Ascona in the canton of Ticino, where, in 1913, she acquired an estate near the local naturopathic institution based on a voluntary association.

Works 
Die Frau als Hausärztin (The Woman as a Family Doctor, 1901) was one of her best-known works.

References 

German women physicians
1856 births
1917 deaths